Sieben Dewaele (born 2 February 1999) is a Belgian professional footballer who plays as a midfielder for Oostende.

Career
On 27 July 2020, Dewaele joined Eredivisie side Heerenveen on a season-long loan deal.

On 31 August 2021, he signed a four-year contract with Oostende and was loaned to French Ligue 2 club Nancy for the 2021–22 season.

Career statistics

References

External links

1999 births
Living people
Belgian footballers
Belgium youth international footballers
Belgium under-21 international footballers
R.S.C. Anderlecht players
SC Heerenveen players
K.V. Oostende players
AS Nancy Lorraine players
Belgian Pro League players
Eredivisie players
Ligue 2 players
Association football midfielders
Belgian expatriate footballers
Expatriate footballers in the Netherlands
Belgian expatriate sportspeople in the Netherlands
Expatriate footballers in France
Belgian expatriate sportspeople in France